Kevin John Ryan (born 20 June 1984) is an Irish actor, known for his television roles in the TV series Copper and Crossbones.

Early life
Ryan was born in Dublin, Ireland, He comes from a family of stonecutters, as a young man, Ryan completed a stonecutting apprenticeship, but his own interests were in the dramatic arts.  He attended Terenure College.

Career
Initially Ryan was a professional dancer, but decided to pursue acting. He moved to Hollywood, where he trained in the Stanislavski system of method acting. His most notable roles are Francis Maguire in Copper, Finnegan in Crossbones and Patrick Ryan in Guilt.

Personal life
Ryan was married to Dedee Pfeiffer from 2009 to 2012.

Filmography

Awards
Ryan was voted one of Ireland's sexiest Irish men (he was voted #70 in Social & Personal's sexiest Irish men 2008 and voted #59 in 2009).

References

External links

1984 births
Irish male film actors
Irish male television actors
Living people
Male actors from Dublin (city)